Jimmie Glenn Ölvestad (born February 16, 1980) is a Swedish former professional ice hockey right wing.  He was drafted in the third round, 88th overall, by the Tampa Bay Lightning in the 1999 NHL Entry Draft.

Playing career

Ölvestad had played three seasons in Sweden for Djurgårdens IF before coming to the NHL in the 2001–02 season to play for the Lightning.  After three seasons in North America, during which he appeared in 111 NHL games with the Lightning, Ölvestad returned to Djurgårdens IF during the 2004–05 NHL lockout.  While the NHL resumed play in the 2005–06 season, Ölvestad decided to remain in Sweden. He made his 500th appearance for Djurgårdens IF against Modo Hockey 3 March 2012. On June 27, 2013, Ölvestad officially announced his retirement.

Personal life 
He is the grandson of the former professional footballer Lennart "Nacka" Skoglund.

Career statistics

Regular season and playoffs

References

External links

Ölvestad retires (Swedish)

1980 births
Djurgårdens IF Hockey players
Hamilton Bulldogs (AHL) players
Living people
Ice hockey people from Stockholm
Springfield Falcons players
Swedish ice hockey forwards
Swedish expatriate ice hockey players in the United States
Tampa Bay Lightning draft picks
Tampa Bay Lightning players